G 2/12 (Tomatoes II) and G 2/13 (Broccoli II) are two decisions by the Enlarged Board of Appeal of the European Patent Office (EPO), which issued on 25 March 2015. The cases were consolidated and are contentwise identical. The cases concern the patentability of biological products through the description of the procedure for achieving that product (a product-by-process claim).

The cases were referred to the Enlarged Board of Appeal by decisions T 1242/06 (Tomatoes II) and T 0083/05 (Broccoli II) of Board 3.3.04. The referrals followed earlier referrals of the same Board of Appeal in the same case (G 2/07 (Tomatoes) and G 2/08 (Broccoli)).

Five years later, in 2020, the Enlarged Board of Appeal overturned in G 3/19 its previous decisions G 2/12 and G 2/13. Namely, it ruled in G 3/19 that "plants and animals exclusively obtained by essentially biological processes are not patentable".

Reception
The decision was viewed as a restriction of breeders' rights through patent law.

Following the decision, the European parliament adopted a non-legislative motion in which it expressed concern that the decision could spark the grant more patents on natural traits of plants introduced in new varieties and called on EU Member States (all of which are European Patent Convention parties) and the European Commission to take action. The Agriculture and Fisheries discussed the case in 2015 and referred it to the Competitiveness council which discussed it in 2016. The Dutch presidency of the EU held a symposium on the matter titled "Finding the Balance - Exploring solutions in the debate surrounding patents and plant breeders’ rights".

References

External links 
 Decision G 2/12, EPO decisions,
 Decision G 2/13, EPO decisions,

G 2012 2
2015 in case law
2015 in Europe